Nationality words link to articles with information on the nation's poetry or literature (for instance, Irish or France).

Events
 November/December – The Federal Convention in Germany prohibits circulation of work by members of the "Young Germany" group of writers and the exiled poet Heinrich Heine.

Works

United Kingdom
 Robert Browning, Paracelsus (reprinted in Poems 1849)
 John Clare, The Rural Muse
 William Cowper, The Works of William Cowper, edited by Robert Southey, 15 volumes published this year through 1837; posthumously published
 George Darley, Nepenthe
 Thomas De Quincey, two essays in the series Recollections of the Lake Poets, in Tait's Edinburgh Magazine on the Lake Poets, a fourth installment on Samuel Taylor Coleridge in January (first installments, which inaugurated the series, in September through November 1834; an essay on William Wordsworth in August (see also Recollections 1839, 1840)
 Leigh Hunt, Captain Sword and Captain Pen
 Letitia Elizabeth Landon, writing under the pen name "L.E.L.", The Vow of the Peacock and Other Poems
 Letitia Elizabeth Landon, writing under the pen name "L.E.L." Fisher's Drawing Room Scrap Book, 1836
 Thomas Moore, The Fudges in England (also see The Fudge Family in Paris 1818)
 William Wordsworth, Yarrow Revisited, and Other Poems

Other in English
 Joseph Rodman Drake, The Culprit Fay and Other Poems, posthumously published; the author, who died in 1820, had ordered his wife to destroy the manuscripts of what he called "trifles in rhyme" after his death, but she refused; contains the author's most popular pieces, including the title poem and "The American Flag"

Works published in other languages
 Franz Grillparzer, Tristia ex Ponto, Austria
 Victor Hugo, Les Chants du crépuscule, France
 Elias Lönnrot, comp., Kalevala, "old" version, Finland
 Karl August Nicander, Hesperider, Sweden
 Frederik Paludan-Müller, Zuleimasflugt ("Zuleima's Flight"), Denmark

Births
Death years link to the corresponding "[year] in poetry" article:
 January 4
Sir Alfred Comyn Lyall (died 1911), English poet in India
Lucy H. Washington (died 1913), American poet and social reformer
 March 28 – Mary H. Gray Clarke (died 1892), American poet, author, correspondent
 April 17 – Augusta Cooper Bristol (died 1910), American
 April 26 – John Warren, 3rd Baron de Tabley (died 1895), English
 May 3 – Alfred Austin (died 1913), English poet laureate
 June 15 – Adah Isaacs Menken (died 1868), American actress, painter and poet
 June 17 – James Brunton Stephens (died 1902), Scottish-born Australian
 June 29 – Celia Thaxter (died 1894), American
 November 11 – Matthías Jochumsson (died 1920), Icelandic lyric poet, playwright, translator and pastor
 December 4 – Samuel Butler (died 1902), English novelist and poet
 December 13 – Phillips Brooks (died 1893), American hymnwriter
Date not known:
 Isodore Gordon Ascher, Canadian
 John James Platt, American

Deaths
Birth years link to the corresponding "[year] in poetry" article:
 March 25 – Friederike Brun, Danish poet (born 1765)
 April 14 – Joseph Grant, Scottish poet (born 1805)
 May 16 – Felicia Dorothea Hemans, English poet (born 1793)
 November 1 – William Motherwell, Scottish poet (born 1797)
 November 21 – James Hogg, Scottish poet and novelist, "the Ettrick shepherd" (born 1770)
 December 25 – Antoine Ó Raifteiri, Irish poet, "last of the wandering bards" (born 1779)

See also

 List of years in poetry
 List of years in literature
 19th century in literature
 19th century in poetry
 Golden Age of Russian Poetry (1800–1850)
 Young Germany (Junges Deutschland) a loose group of German writers from about 1830 to 1850
 List of poets
 Poetry
 List of poetry awards

Notes

19th-century poetry
Poetry